Alexander Central High School (ACHS) is a public, co-educational secondary school located in Taylorsville, North Carolina. It is the only high school in the Alexander County Schools system.

History
Alexander Central was expanded in 2001 to double in size. Construction was completed in just one year.

Demographics
For the 2010–2011 school year, Alexander Central High School had a total population of 1,714 students and 94.43 staff on a (FTE) basis.

Administration
The principal of the school is Doug Rhoney. He started in 2011 and was previously principal of West Caldwell High School in Lenoir, North Carolina. Assistant principals are Crystal Hoke, Brian Lewis, and Janel Lingle.

Athletics
Alexander Central is part of the North Carolina High School Athletic Association (NCHSAA). Alexander Central is classified as a 4A school, and are members of the Northwestern 3A/4A conference. The schools team name is the Cougars, wearing the school colors of blue and vegas gold. 

They compete in various sports throughout the school year. In the Fall: cheerleading, crosscountry, JV & varsity football, girls golf, boys soccer, girls tennis, and volleyball. Winter sports include boys & girls JV & varsity basketball, freshmen basketball, cheerleading, indoor track, swimming, and wrestling. In the Spring, competitions include baseball, boys golf, girls soccer, softball, boys tennis, and track & field.

The school softball team has had a history of success, winning state championships in 1979, 1991, 1994, 1995, 1996, 2009, 2011, 2013, 2014, and 2018.

Extracurricular activities
Alexander Central High School has many extracurricular activities for students to participate in:

Yearbook
The yearbook of ACHS is called the Alexcentrian. In 2003, it won a yearbook award from the North Carolina Scholastic Media Association.

Other activities
An atlas created by the Geographic Information Services (GIS) class at ACHS was published in 2007. Instructor, and county IT director, Eric Walker worked with the county's GIS department head, George Brown, for assistance in the project. Originally planned as just a 60-page booklet, the Alexander County Mapbook is a 160-page atlas of the county divided into seven sections: geography, history, government, education, economy, retail and arts and recreation.

The Agricultural Education program was awarded a $3,300 grant by Lowe's Home Improvement during the 2011–2012 to build an aquaculture facility at the school. Along with learning about safe food supplies and alternatives to natural river fishing, students will learn about conversion of fish waste to plant food.

References

External links
 

Buildings and structures in Alexander County, North Carolina
Education in Alexander County, North Carolina
Public high schools in North Carolina